Bifonazole (trade name Canespor among others) is an imidazole antifungal drug used in form of ointments.

It was patented in 1974 and approved for medical use in 1983. There are also combinations with carbamide for the treatment of onychomycosis.

Adverse effects
The most common side effect is a burning sensation at the application site. Other reactions, such as itching, eczema or skin dryness, are rare.
Bifonazole is a potent aromatase inhibitor in vitro.

Pharmacology

Mechanism of action
Bifonazole has a dual mode of action. It inhibits fungal ergosterol biosynthesis at two points, via transformation of 24-methylendihydrolanosterol to desmethylsterol, together with inhibition of HMG-CoA. This enables fungicidal properties against dermatophytes and distinguishes bifonazole from other antifungal drugs.

Pharmacokinetics
Six hours after application, bifonazole concentrations range from 1000 µg/cm³ in the stratum corneum to 5 µg/cm³ in the papillary dermis.

References

Further reading 

 

21-Hydroxylase inhibitors
Imidazole antifungals
Biphenyls
Antifungals
Aromatase inhibitors
CYP17A1 inhibitors
Lanosterol 14α-demethylase inhibitors